Wolseley (formerly Tatiara) is a small South Australian town near the Victorian border. It is five kilometres south of the Dukes Highway and 13 kilometres east of Bordertown.  It was first proclaimed a town in 1884.

The 2016 Australian census which was conducted in August 2016 reports that Wolseley had a population of 180 people.

History
The town was surveyed in 1884, and initially named Tatiara, which was described as an "Aboriginal word from the Jackegilbrab Tribe which HC Talbot states is divided into six clans (Kooinkill, Wirriga, Chala, Camiaguigara, Niall & Nunkoora)". The railway station was named after Lord Wolseley, who was the Commander-in-Chief of the British Army. The name of the town was changed to match the name of the station on 20 February 1941.

The depot started operations in 1942 and three additional tanks were added later. It was disbanded on 14 June 1944. It is listed on the South Australian Heritage Register as the Wolseley Inland Aircraft Fuel Depot.

Railway

The Adelaide–Wolseley railway was opened from Adelaide east to Wolseley railway station in the early 1880s built to  broad gauge. The Serviceton railway line from Melbourne reached Serviceton in Victoria in 1886, and the three miles from Wolseley to Serviceton was completed by the South Australian Railways in 1887, completing a broad gauge rail link between Adelaide and Melbourne. Around the same time, the Mount Gambier railway line  narrow gauge railway extended to Wolseley station from the south, creating a break-of-gauge rail junction.

By May 1883, rail construction had not yet been completed, but trains were able to operate regularly from Bordertown on the Adelaide line and from Custon on the Mount Gambier line, continuing through Naracoorte to Kingston SE.

In 1881, the Government of South Australia authorised the construction of a  railway from "University Block No. 3" near the southern border of the Hundred of Tatiara to Border Town. It had previously authorised the construction from Naracoorte to that point in 1879.

In the 1950s the break-of-gauge was abolished by the conversion of the Mount Gambier line to broad gauge. If it is converted, it will become the first railway line in Australia to have ever been converted to all 3 gauges.

Railway containers 

In 1936, to help overcome some of the inconveniences of the break of gauge, containers were introduced to allow though shipment of goods without the need for transshipment.

Governance
Wolseley is located in the federal division of Barker, the state electoral district of MacKillop and the local government area of Tatiara District Council.

See also
Wolseley Common Conservation Park

References 

Towns in South Australia
Limestone Coast